Norman "Keith" Boardman AO, FRS (born 16 August 1926, in Geelong, Victoria) is an Australian biochemist.
He was elected Fellow of the Australian Academy of Science in 1972.

Life
Boardman earned a MSC from University of Melbourne and PhD, and ScD from University of Cambridge. 
He was Research Scientist at Commonwealth Scientific and Industrial Research Organisation from 1956 to 1968 and was Chief Research Scientist from 1968 to 1977.

He studied the biochemistry, development and molecular architecture of chloroplasts and  pioneered the physical separation of the two photochemical systems of photosynthesis.

He was awarded the David Syme Research Prize in 1967 and elected a Fellow of the Royal Society in 1978. He was made an Officer of the Order of Australia in 1993.

References

External links
Interviews: Dr Keith Boardman, Biochemist

1926 births
Living people
People from Geelong
Australian biochemists
Fellows of the Royal Society
Fellows of the Australian Academy of Technological Sciences and Engineering
Fellows of the Australian Academy of Science
Officers of the Order of Australia